Avinder Singh Brar was an Indian Police Service officer who was killed by suspected militants in 1987 in Punjab, India. At the time of his death, he was senior superintendent of police of Patiala. He was awarded Padma Shri in 1988.

He studied at St. George's College, Mussoorie and at Delhi University's St Stephen's College. He was a keen swimmer and held a national record in the 100 m breaststroke. He was awarded the Asiad Jyoti for organising the swimming events at the Asian Games in New Delhi. He was survived by his wife, Sukhdeep, an IAS officer, and two children: a three-year-old son and a one-year-old daughter.

References

Indian police officers killed in the line of duty
Indian Police Service officers
People murdered in Punjab, India
1987 murders in India
People from Faridkot district
Indian Sikhs
Assassinated Indian people
Male murder victims
Victims of the insurgency in Punjab
Deaths by firearm in India
Assassinated police officers
Recipients of the Padma Shri in civil service
St. Stephen's College, Delhi alumni
Indian male swimmers
1955 births
Victims of Sikh terrorism
Swimmers from Punjab, India
1987 deaths